Renato Castellani (4 September 1913 in Varigotti, Liguria – 28 December 1985 in Rome) was an Italian film director and screenwriter.

Early life 
Son of a representative of Kodak, he was born in Varigotti, a hamlet at the time of Final Pia, which became Finale Ligure (Savona) in 1927, where his mother had returned from Argentina to give birth to his son. He spent his childhood in Argentina, in the city of Rosario. After 12 years, he returned to Liguria and resumed his studies in Genoa. He moved to Milan, where he graduated from the Polytechnic University in architecture. In Milan he met Livio Castiglioni and together they aired for GUF (Fascist University Group) L'ora radiofonica and La fontana malata by Aldo Palazzeschi, experimenting with new techniques for sound editing on radio.

Career 
He began collaborating in 1936 as a military consultant for The Great Appeal, a film by Mario Camerini. He worked as a film critic and worked - as a screenwriter or assistant director - with important names of the Italian cinema of the time, such as Augusto Genina, with whom he signed the script for Castles in the air (1939), by Mario Soldati, of which he was assistant director on the set of Malombra (1942). He then worked with the director Alessandro Blasetti, signing the screenplays of his movies An Adventure of Salvator Rosa (1939), The Iron Crown (1941), Four Steps in the Clouds (1942) and with the director Camillo Mastrocinque, signing the screenplay of The Cuckoo Clock (1938).

His first work as a director was A Pistol Shot (1942), based on a story by Aleksandr Puskin, in which Alberto Moravia also took part in the screenplay, with Fosco Giachetti and Assia Noris. This movie, as well as the subsequent Zazà (1942), fit into the caligraphism genre.

With Under the Sun of Rome (1948), It's Forever Springtime (1950), both shot outdoors with non-professional actors, and especially Two Cents Worth of Hope (1952), Castellani gave rise to a new genre, defined as "pink neorealism", considered by critics at the time as the downward trend of neorealism, but destined to a vast audience success.

With Two Cents Worth of Hope, he won the ex aequo Grand Prix at the 1952 Cannes Film Festival. With Romeo and Juliet (1954), he won the Golden Lion at the 1954 Venice Film Festival.

After some other significant films such as Dreams in a Drawer (1957) and The Brigand (1961), Castellani devoted himself mainly to biopics in episodes shot for television, widely followed, such as The Life of Leonardo da Vinci (1971) and The Life of Verdi (1982).

Filmography

Film

Television 

 The Life of Leonardo da Vinci (Rai, 1971)
 Il furto della Gioconda (Rai, 1978)
 The Life of Verdi (Rai, 1982)

Theater 

 Blithe Spirit, by Noël Coward, Rome, Teatro delle Arti, December 1945

See also 

 Cinema of Italy
 Neorealism
 Caligraphism
 Luciano Emmer
 Steno

References

Bibliography

Further reading

Externals links 
 

1913 births
1985 deaths
Italian film directors
20th-century Italian screenwriters
Nastro d'Argento winners
Directors of Palme d'Or winners
Directors of Golden Lion winners
Italian male screenwriters
20th-century Italian male writers